Cleethorpes is a seaside town on the estuary of the Humber in North East Lincolnshire, England with a population of 38,372 in 2020. It has been permanently occupied since the 6th century, with fishing as its original industry, then developing into a resort in the 19th century.

The town lies on the Greenwich meridian and its average annual rainfall is amongst the lowest in the British Isles.

In 2021, The Trainline named Cleethorpes beach the second best seaside destination in the UK that is reachable by train, just behind Margate.

History
The name Cleethorpes is thought to come from joining the words clee, an old word for clay, and thorpes, an Old English/Old Norse word for villages, and is of comparatively modern origin.
Before becoming a unified town, Cleethorpes was made up of three small villages, or "thorpes": Itterby, Oole and Thrunscoe, which were part of a wider parish called Clee (centred on Old Clee).

Whilst there are Neolithic and Bronze Age remains in the area, permanent occupation appears to date from the 6th century, with substantial communities appearing only in the 9th century when the Danes arrived.

The manor of Itterby was purchased in 1616 by the trustees of Peter Blundell's charity for the benefit of scholars and fellows at Sidney Sussex College, Cambridge from Blundell's School, Tiverton. This is reflected in many of the street and park names in the area.

Cleethorpes developed as a fishing village. By the time of the 1801 census the population was 284. The 1820s saw the first developments of Cleethorpes as a health holiday resort, with sea-bathing and the taking of medicinal waters becoming fashionable. By 1831 the population had increased to 497.

In 1842 the Cleethorpes Enclosure Bill was enacted.  of land were divided among land owners and eight new roads developed. In 1848 Cleethorpes was described as "...much resorted to as a bathing-place, for which it is highly eligible; the air is pure, the scenery good and besides a few lodging-houses and smaller inns, there is a large hotel, built some years since, on an eminence embracing extensive views of the sea, the Humber, and the Yorkshire coast. Many of the population are employed in the oyster-fisheries."

The resort expanded following the linking of the town by railway with industrial towns in Yorkshire. Cleethorpes Pier opened in 1873 and the promenade in 1885. Cleethorpes with Thrunscoe was created as a Local Board of Health District in 1873, and under the Local Government Act of 1894 it became an urban district. Its headquarters was established at Cleethorpes Town Hall in 1905.

In 1916 the urban district was renamed Cleethorpes, and in 1922 and 1927 the town's boundaries were extended to include part of Humberston (as far as North Sea Lane) and the Beacon Hill area of Weelsby parish. In 1936 Cleethorpes was granted a charter of incorporation to become a municipal borough.

Cleethorpes successfully resisted attempts by Grimsby to absorb it and in 1974 it became the Borough of Cleethorpes within the new county of Humberside. However, when Humberside County Council was abolished in 1996, Cleethorpes Borough Council was joined with Grimsby Borough Council as the unitary authority of North East Lincolnshire. In 2009 North East Lincolnshire Council agreed to market the towns of Grimsby, Immingham and Cleethorpes, under the 'Greater Grimsby' banner.

Local residents from Lincolnshire and the Yorkshire and Humber area affectionately refer to Cleethorpes as Meggies. Cleethorpes can also be known as "down beach".

Redevelopment

The Winter Gardens, a venue for a variety of events, was demolished in 2007 and replaced by 47 flats. During a mass boycott of punk bands in the 1970s the Winter Gardens was just one of five U.K. venues that allowed the likes of the Clash, AC/DC and the Sex Pistols to perform. The old mini steam railway running from the seafront Leisure centre to St Anthony's bank has been extended and significantly improved whilst a cafe, taphouse, and gallery has been added to the boating lake, many ducks and geese use the boating lake to breed making it a pleasant place to visit. A large open air show ground has been built close to the eastern end of the boating lake often showing live bands and hosting special events, most notably hosting the London 2012 Olympic torch relay.
A new RNLI station is set to be completed on the Central Promenade by 2023.

Twin town
Cleethorpes is twinned with Königswinter, Germany.

Geography

The Greenwich meridian passes through the town and a signpost shows some distances to worldwide locations. North Pole 4,051 km (2,517 mi), South Pole 15,963 km (9,919 mi), New York City 5,602 km (3,481 mi), London 230 km (143 mi).

Cleethorpes is physically linked to the neighbouring town of Grimsby by built up residential estates and the villages of Old Clee and Weelsby are also contiguous with the two towns.

Climate

As with most of the British Isles, Cleethorpes experiences a maritime climate. It has mild summers and cool winters. The average annual rainfall is amongst the lowest in the British Isles.

Amenities

Transport

Bus services to Grimsby, Immingham and nearby villages are operated by Stagecoach Grimsby-Cleethorpes. There is a bus service to Skegness via Louth, which runs once a day on weekends in the summer, provided by Stagecoach Grimsby-Cleethorpes.

From Cleethorpes railway station, operated by TransPennine Express, train services run, via Grimsby, to Barton-upon-Humber (for bus link to Hull), Manchester Airport (South TransPennine) and Newark-on-Trent. Trains to London are available by travelling to Doncaster then switching to services to London Kings Cross. The railway station is also served by Northern and East Midlands Railway.

Cleethorpes is at the end of the A180, A16 and A46 roads.

Education

Secondary schools in Cleethorpes include Cleethorpes Academy and Beacon Academy.

From September 2011, N.E. Lincolnshire SSP was the only remaining School Sports Partnership after government funding cuts.

Religion

The parish church is St Peter's, built in 1866. Other churches are St Francis of Assisi on Sandringham Road, and Holy Trinity and St Mary's Church in Old Clee, the oldest building (built 950 AD) in Grimsby. Christ Church of Cleethorpes, near Machray Place, is also one of the larger parishes.

Sport
Cleethorpes is home to Blundell Park, the home ground of the football team, Grimsby Town, one of few English League clubs with a town or city name to have their home ground in a different community.
There is an athletics club and Cleethorpes Rugby Union Football Club who play in the Midlands 4 East (NE).

Cleethorpes cricket ground, known as Cleethorpes Sports Ground, is located on Chichester Road. It hosts professional games such as the 20/20 cup and various county games played by Lincolnshire County Cricket Club, and the Vagabonds cricket team.

Cleethorpes Town F.C. play in the Northern Premier League - South East Division. Their home matches are played at the Linden Homes Club, Clee Road, Grimsby.

Leisure/other sports
The old Cleethorpes bathing pool was demolished and replaced in the eighties with a modern leisure centre. Facilities include a large indoor wave pool, badminton and squash courts, a gym and sports hall. The local badminton club meets here.

A greyhound racing track was opened around the outside of the stock car racing track in 1981 (which was on the site of the former Cleethorpes Marineland & Zoo which closed in 1977). The racing was independent (not affiliated to the sports governing body the National Greyhound Racing Club NGRC) and was known as a flapping track, which was the nickname given to independent tracks. In 1983 there were plans to build new kennels and join the NGRC  but racing only lasted until midway through 1986. The stock cars closed in the mid-1990s.

Governance

Cleethorpes is currently part of the parliamentary constituency of the same name, which also includes other towns in the area, including Immingham and Barton-upon-Humber. Prior to 1997, Cleethorpes had been included in the constituencies of Brigg and Cleethorpes, Louth (Lincolnshire) and Grimsby.

Since 1945, the members of parliament for Cleethorpes have been as follows:

Since 1996 Cleethorpes has formed an unparished area in the unitary borough of North East Lincolnshire. Cleethorpes comprises three of the borough's sixteen wards: Croft Baker, Haverstoe and Sidney Sussex. Each ward returns three councillors, so Cleethorpes is represented by 9 of 42 members of the council. Cleethorpes does not have its own town council; however, the nine councillors form the Charter Trustees of the Town of Cleethorpes.

Council wards and elected members
North East Lincolnshire Council has three Council Wards within the area of Cleethorpes. As of 3 May 2018, the councillors are:

Croft Baker Ward:

 Oliver Freeston (C)
 Bob Callison (C)
 Kathryn Wheatley (L)

Sidney Sussex Ward:

 Gaynor Rogers (L)
 Marie Green (L)
 Debbie Rodwell (L)

Haverstoe Ward:

 Bill Parkinson (C)
 Peter C. Smith (C)
 Margaret Cracknell (C)
 Keith Brookes (C)

KEY: (L) = Labour Party (C) = Conservative Party

Landmarks 

While commonly referred to as a seaside resort, Cleethorpes actually sits on the Humber Estuary. The sea at Cleethorpes is actually the mouth of the Humber. This means that bathers are separated from the sea by several hundred metres of sand at low tide.

The sea front provides views of shipping traffic entering and leaving the Humber for the ports of Grimsby, Immingham, Hull and Goole.

Two large fortifications, the Humber Forts, are visible in the mouth of the river. On a clear day, the lighthouse situated on Spurn Point can be seen with the naked eye from the North Beach.

There is a Royal National Lifeboat Institution station near the pier and next to the Coastguard on Central Promenade. Work began on a new, larger RNLI station in 2022. Cleethorpes Rescue also protect the beach.

Cleethorpes has a large boating lake with many varieties of ducks, swans and geese. There is also a  local nature reserve: Cleethorpes Country Park, situated between the resort and the village of Humberston. To the south of Cleethorpes, near Humberston, is a yacht club.

The Cleethorpes Leisure Centre was opened in 1983 to replace the open bathing pool that was wrecked by storms on 11 January 1978. The leisure centre contains a 33-metre pool, 1.8 metres deep, as well as a water slide and a wave machine. The building also contains a gym and a sports hall. In 2012, major work was carried out to the roof of the building due to water damage.

Ross Castle, a mock ruin of a castle built in 1885 by the Manchester, Sheffield and Lincolnshire Railway, was named after Edward Ross, secretary of the railway company. Its height was the highest point on the cliffs. After a period of closure, the castle was renovated, re-opening in June 2008 to the public. Possibilities of a further closure have been raised after a woman fell to her death on 9 January 2009.
In 2007 the town was the Royal Horticultural Societies Britain in Bloom award winner in the coastal category. The town was also received a Silver-Gilt award, a Tourism Award and Jeff Blanchard the Shredded Wheat Community Champions award.

A statue of the Boy with the Leaking Boot was given to the town in 1918 by John Carlborn. It is reported that he was a Swedish immigrant to Cleethorpes who had built up a successful shipping business, and that the statue was a copy of one in the Hasselbacken Restaurant in Stockholm, Sweden. The Cleethorpes statue now stands in a pond in the Diana Princess of Wales Memorial Gardens, on Kingsway. It was stolen and replaced in 2002 and 2008, and vandalised in October 2011. In July 2012, two youths were recorded on CCTV as they frolicked naked in the pond and destroyed the fountain. A replacement statue was made by a local garden ornaments manufacturer and installed with improved security in September 2012. A nearby pub was named The Leaking Boot, but was destroyed by fire in June 2009.

Other visitor attractions 

 Cleethorpes Coast Light Railway
 The Signal Box Inn  (aka The Smallest Pub on the Planet).
 Cleethorpes Pier
 Discovery Centre
 Floyd the Dragon - The Cleethorpes mascot
 Meridian Point
 Pleasure Island Family Theme Park (closed in October 2016)
 The Jungle Zoo.
 The Magical Castle
 Classic Home Cinema : one of the few remaining cinema shops (8, super 8, 9.5 and 16 mm)
There was a roll of honour at Matthew Humberston Foundation School commemorating the deaths of 42 past pupils of the school who died in World War I, but after the closure of the school in 2010, it was put into storage at the North East Lincolnshire Council offices.  the roll of honour was still being stored by the council, "with a view to being put on public display in a new town centre museum and heritage centre".

UFO sighting
On 22 September 1956 at 3pm a UFO was spotted for more than an hour off the Cleethorpes coast; it was seen by radar at RAF Manby too. It was a large spherical object with a glass appearance. The Lakenheath-Bentwaters incident had happened the month before.

Notable people
Kristian Adams (b. 1976), cricketer, played for Kent and Lincolnshire, born in Cleethorpes
Jane Andrews, English former Royal dresser and convicted murderer of Tom Cressman
Bill Appleyard (1879–1958), footballer for Newcastle United, born in Cleethorpes
Phil Ball, writer, brought up in Cleethorpes
H. Hugh Bancroft, organist and composer
Stephen Bennett, golfer
John Cockerill, footballer
Peter Collinson, film producer and director
Bob Cottam, cricketer
Eorl Crabtree, rugby league footballer
Michele Dotrice, actress
Helen Fospero, television newsreader and journalist
Vivean Gray, actress
Alan Green, local politician
Chris Hargreaves, ex-footballer and ex-manager of Torquay United 
Patricia Hodge, actress
Linda Ingham, artist
Jo Kendall, actress
John Maltby, potter and sculptor
Gemma Merna, actress
Don Oslear, cricket umpire
Michael Parsons, singer, songwriter and earlier member of the boyband District3
Helen Roberts, singer and actress
Paul Roberts, cricketer
Carl Ross, fishery entrepreneur
Rod Temperton, songwriter, record producer and musician
Bridget Turner, actress
Richard Witts, musicologist and ex-leader of 1980s group the Passage
John Derek Woollins, chemist
Darren Wrack, footballer
Patrick Wymark, actor

See also
Brigg and Cleethorpes (UK Parliament constituency)
Compass FM
Humber Coast & City Railway
Orpheus Male Voice Choir, Grimsby & Cleethorpes
Trolleybuses in Cleethorpes
Yellowbelly (Lincolnshire)
Things To Do in Cleethorpes

References

External links

 
Towns in Lincolnshire
Seaside resorts in England
Populated coastal places in Lincolnshire
Folly castles in England
Beaches of Lincolnshire
Local Government Districts created by the Local Government Act 1858
Unparished areas in Lincolnshire
Borough of North East Lincolnshire